Pukch'ŏng County is a county in eastern South Hamgyŏng province, North Korea.

Geography
It borders the Sea of Japan (East Sea of Korea) to the south. Away from the coast, it is entirely mountainous. The Hamgyong Mountains traverse the county. The highest point is Komdoksan.  Chief streams include the Namdaechon and Pochonchon (보천천).  It has a relatively mild climate for the province.

Administrative divisions
Pukch'ŏng county is divided into 1 ŭp (town), 2 rodongjagu (workers' districts) and 38 ri (villages):

Economy
Much of the economy in Pukchong County consists of agriculture, with fruit farming specifically making up a significant portion. Aside from farming, industry also makes up a portion of the county's economy, although details of specifically what industries exist in the county are scant.

Briefly mentioned by the North Korean state-controlled newspaper The Pyongyang Times, there is said to be a shoe factory in Pukchong County.

Also according to The Pyongyang Times, a pig farm in Pukchong County was inaugurated in August 2021. The farm, whose English name is given as the Pukchong Pig Farm, is said to include an inspection room, fattening and breeding blocks, a feed processing and transportation system, as well as a means to produce organic fertilizer.

Transportation
Pukch'ŏng county is served by the Tŏksŏng and P'yŏngra lines of the Korean State Railway, as well as by roads.

See also
Geography of North Korea
Administrative divisions of North Korea
South Hamgyong

References

External links

Counties of South Hamgyong